The Huntsville–Decatur, AL Combined Statistical Area is the most populated sub-region of North Alabama, and is the second fastest growing region in the State of Alabama, with 659,486 living within the CSA. It is also currently the 57th largest CSA in the country.

The CSA is situated along the Tennessee River, and is made up of two separate metropolitan areas (Decatur and Huntsville) that are usually referred to as one. The Decatur MSA lies south of the Tennessee River and the Huntsville MSA lies north of it.

Significant cities included in the CSA include Athens, Decatur, Hartselle, Huntsville, and Madison, as well as Lawrence, Limestone, Madison, and Morgan counties.

Huntsville is the largest city in the area with a population of 215,006 people, and a metro population of 502,728. Decatur is the second largest city with a population of 57,938 people, and a metro population of 156,758.

Counties
 Lawrence
 Limestone
 Madison
 Morgan

Metropolitan areas included
 Decatur Metropolitan Area
 Huntsville Metropolitan Area

Cities

Core cities
 Huntsville
 Decatur

Cities with more than 50,000 inhabitants
 Madison

Cities with 10,000–25,000 inhabitants
 Athens
 Hartselle

Cities with 5,000–9,999 inhabitants
 Harvest
 Meridianville
 Monrovia
 Moores Mill

Cities, and towns with less than 4,999 inhabitants

Education

K–12 education
School systems by county:

Madison
 Huntsville City Schools
 Madison County Schools 
 Madison City Schools

Limestone
 Athens City Schools
 Limestone County Schools
Morgan
 Decatur City Schools
 Hartselle City Schools
 Morgan County Schools
Lawrence
 Lawrence County Schools

Institutions of higher education
 Calhoun Community College System
 Calhoun Decatur Campus
 Calhoun Redstone Arsenal Campus
 Calhoun Huntsville/Cummings Research Park Campus
 University of Alabama in Huntsville
 Alabama A&M University
 Oakwood University
 Huntsville Regional Medical Campus of the University of Alabama at Birmingham School of Medicine;
 Athens State University;
 Georgia Institute of Technology's two sites Huntsville ;
 Faulkner University;
 Columbia College;
 Virginia College Huntsville;
 Florida Institute of Technology, and
 Embry-Riddle Aeronautical University.

Geography
The geography of the Huntsville-Decatur Metro Area ranges from the tall peaks of the southern Appalachian Mountains, to the low valleys formed by the Tennessee River.  Decatur sits on the southern shore of the Tennessee River, while Huntsville lies about 10 miles from the Tennessee River, and sits at the base of Monte Sano Mountain.
 Tennessee Valley
 Wheeler National Wildlife Refuge
 Monte Sano State Park
 Joe Wheeler State Park

Infrastructure

Roadways
The heart of the Huntsville–Decatur Metro Area (Huntsville, Decatur, and Madison) is linked together by the 22 mile strip of Interstate 565.

Interstate 565 begins at the very edge of the Decatur City Limits at a major interchange with Interstate 65. At the interchange, Alternate US 72 and State Route 20 turn into a controlled access highway taking up the name Interstate 565 as it passes under Interstate 65 receiving traffic from the north – (Nashville), and south – (Birmingham / Decatur / Hartselle) on top of the nearly 40,000-51,000 vehicles per day driving from Decatur to Huntsville on the Alternate US 72 Corridor.

Plans are underway to extend Interstate 565 from the Interstate 65/Alternate US 72/State Route 20 interchange to the US 31/State Route 20/Alternate US 72 interchange in Decatur's Limestone County limits. Eventually the extended Interstate Highway will cross the Tennessee River's Wheeler Lake connecting with the proposed Memphis to Atlanta Highway.

Huntsville/Madison roadways
As Interstate 565 exits the northern portion of the Wheeler National Wildlife Refuge, Madison Boulevard (formerly State Route 20) branches off of the interstate leading into Madison. After Madison Boulevard converges with Interstate 565 nine miles down the road, Research Park Boulevard, an important north/south expressway serving Cummings Research Park, MidCity (a mixed used development at the location of the former Madison Square Mall), and Redstone Arsenal, bypasses the northern section of Huntsville's busier Memorial Parkway.

Interstate 565 winds past the US Space and Rocket Center. As it approaches downtown, the interstate becomes elevated. About a  after the elevated portion of the interstate begins is the largest interchange in Huntsville. The I-565/Memorial Parkway interchange carries over 150,000 vehicles a day. Memorial Parkway stretches from the Tennessee River to Normal. The Parkway feeds the 7-lane University Drive, also known as US 72. Also intersecting the Parkway is the 5-lane Governors Drive (US 431) that serves southeast Huntsville, Hampton Cove, and Huntsville Hospital. Interstate 565 ascends Chapman Mountain, and descends the other side towards Gurley as US 72.

Decatur roadways
Decatur's main roadways are 6th Avenue – (U.S. Route 31), and Beltline Road – State Route 67.

6th Avenue, part of U.S. Route 31, begins as both State Route 20/Alternate US 72, and US 31 are carved out of the "Steamboat Bill" Hudson Memorial Bridge that crosses the Tennessee River at the north central part of town. AL 20/Alt US 72 continues west towards The Shoals, after The Beltline begins in the vicinity of the Solutia plant. After the Tennessee River bridges 6th Avenue continues southward where it eventually intersects with The Beltline.  After that intersection, 6th Avenue continues southward now under the name of Decatur Highway towards Hartselle and Birmingham.

The Beltline was built as a western bypass to cure 6th Avenue of its congestion problem. The area around the Beltline experienced rapid growth, causing even worse traffic problems. The city's approach to this was to widen the road to six lanes, which was to be completed by 2010.

Economy
The economy of the Huntsville-Decatur Area is made up mostly of Technical, Aerospace, Manufacturing, and Defensive jobs, and companies. Huntsville is also home to the second largest research park in the country, Cummings Research Park.

The Huntsville–Decatur Metro Area is the second fastest growing region/metro area in the state of Alabama because of the ample job opportunities being instilled in the area. Both ports in the metro area are two of the busiest in the state. Huntsville International Airport is the second busiest in Alabama, and still growing, trailing Birmingham International Airport in Birmingham. The Port of Decatur, along the Tennessee River, has grown to be the largest/busiest along the Tennessee River.

Tennessee Valley Authority
The Tennessee Valley Authority (TVA) was established by President Franklin D. Roosevelt's New Deal plan, creating numerous dams, locks, nuclear power plants, coal power plants, along with many others, to create jobs along one of the most poverty ridden regions in the United States. The TVA has turned many tired North Alabama towns into some of the most technologically advanced cities in the country. A high quality of living, has helped to fuel the Huntsville and Decatur area's explosion into the aerospace, bio-technical, and other research market areas of the U.S.

The Tennessee Valley Authority has grown to be the largest public utility provider in the United States.

TVA links
 TVA home page
 WPA Photographs of TVA Archaeological Projects

Major employers
 ADTRAN
 Athens Limestone Hospital – Athens/Limestone County
 Boeing – Decatur/Huntsville
 United Launch Alliance – Decatur
 Calhoun Community College System – Decatur/Huntsville
 Cinram – Huntsville
 Cummings Research Park
 Decatur General Hospital system – Decatur
 Huntsville Hospital System – Huntsville
 Intergraph – Madison
 Marshall Space Flight Center – Huntsville/Madison County
 Meow Mix – Decatur
 Nucor Corporation – Decatur
 Parkway Medical Center – Decatur
 Redstone Arsenal – Huntsville/Madison County
 SAIC – Huntsville
 Teledyne Brown Engineering – Huntsville
 Toyota – Huntsville
 TVA – Decatur/Limestone County
 University of Alabama in Huntsville – Huntsville
 Vulcan Materials Company – Trinity, Huntsville

References

External links

Huntsville links
 City of Huntsville
 Convention and Visitors Bureau
 Chamber of Commerce
 The Arts Council, Inc.
 The Huntsville Times

Decatur links
 Official City Website: DigitalDecatur
 Official Decatur-Morgan County Website
 The Decatur Daily
 Decatur Convention & Visitor's Bureau
 Decatur Morgan County Chamber of Commerce
 Decatur City Schools
 Decatur Sports
 Alabama Jubilee – Hot Air Balloon Classic
 Decatur Parks and Recreation
 Morgan County Economic Development Association

 
Geography of Lawrence County, Alabama
Geography of Limestone County, Alabama
Geography of Madison County, Alabama
Geography of Morgan County, Alabama
Combined statistical areas of the United States